Novosyolovka is a rural locality (a selo) in Starooskolsky District, Belgorod Oblast, Russia. The population was 241 as of 2010. There are 5 streets.

Geography 
Novosyolovka is located 7 km west of Stary Oskol (the district's administrative centre) by road. Yezdotsky is the nearest rural locality.

References 

Rural localities in Starooskolsky District